Sir Percy Malcolm Stewart, 1st Baronet (9 May 1872 – 27 February 1951), was an English industrialist and philanthropist. He incorporated The London Brick Company in the 1920s which was at the time reputed to be the largest brick making company in the United Kingdom.

Early life
Stewart was born at St Leonards, Sussex, sixth of eight children of Halley Stewart. Stewart attended the University School, Hastings, the King's School, Rochester, and the Royal High School, Edinburgh, and was also educated in Germany. He entered his father's business in 1891. The family lived in Luton until the early 1900s at Bramingham Shott estate, their home went on to become Luton Museum, and the estate Wardown Park.

Business
The cement business in which the family was interested - B. J. Forder & Son Ltd - became part of the British Portland Cement Manufacturers Ltd in 1912, and Stewart became a managing director.  He had remained managing director of the brick division of B. J. Forder & Son until it was amalgamated into The London Brick Company in 1923, and Stewart became chairman of its board.  He became chairman of the board of the Associated Portland Cement Manufacturers Ltd. (APCM) in 1924 and remained in that position until 1945 when he became company president.  He was thus chairman of the two of the largest monopolistic companies in British industry.

Influence
Sir Percy Malcolm Stewart and his father, Sir Halley Stewart, believed in good working and living conditions for employees.  They developed the model village of Stewartby in Bedfordshire from 1926 onwards.  As a special commissioner appointed by Ramsay MacDonald's coalition government of 1934, he helped devise schemes to reduce unemployment. In 1934, Sir Malcolm bought The Lodge at Sandy, which is currently the headquarters of The RSPB. Stewart was created a Baronet, of Stewartby in the County of Bedford, in 1937.  He was a governor of The Peckham Experiment in 1949.

During the 1930s, the hamlet of Wooton Pillinge, Bedfordshire, near the largest concentration of brickworks, was rebuilt as a model village for brick workers, and renamed Stewartby.

Death
He died in February 1951, aged 78, and was succeeded in the baronetcy by his son Ronald.

References

Kidd, Charles, Williamson, David (editors). Debrett's Peerage and Baronetage (1990 edition). New  York: St Martin's Press, 1990.

Bibliography

Shakespeare, Geoffrey, ‘Stewart, Sir (Percy) Malcolm, first baronet (1872–1951)’, rev. Chris Pickford, Oxford Dictionary of National Biography, Oxford: Oxford University Press, 2004. Retrieved 5 September 2007.

External links
Article on the village of Stewartby

1872 births
1951 deaths
Baronets in the Baronetage of the United Kingdom
English philanthropists
People from Luton
Deputy Lieutenants of Bedfordshire
English businesspeople
People educated at the Royal High School, Edinburgh